Jermaine Crawford (born October 28, 1992) is an actor best known for appearing on the HBO original series The Wire as Dukie Weems. He is a second cousin to fellow The Wire cast member and actor Tristan Wilds.

Career 
Crawford started performing at the age of three. He has had prominent roles in the theatrical productions of Children of Eden at the Ford Theatre directed by David Bell; Carousel and The Miracle Worker at the Olney Theatre, as directed by Bill Pasquanti; and, A Midsummer Night's Dream at the historic Shakespeare Theatre Company, as directed by Mark Lamos. He was also a youth spokesperson for the American Diabetes Association.

Crawford starred in the 2009 film adaptation of the Alvin Moore Jr. stage play A Mother's Prayer, which also features Johnny Gill, Robin Givens and Shirley Murdock, and more recently in the 2010 Joel Schumacher film Twelve.

Filmography

Film

Television

References

External links
 Jermaine Crawford Article on Hiphopdx
 Jermaine Crawford Interview on Dubcnn
 

African-American male actors
American male child actors
1992 births
Living people
Male actors from New York City
20th-century American male actors
21st-century American male actors
20th-century African-American people
21st-century African-American people